Runella defluvii  is a Gram-negative, rod-shaped, strictly aerobic and non-motile bacterium from the genus of Runella which has been isolated from activated sludge in Korea.

References

External links
Type strain of Runella limosa at BacDive -  the Bacterial Diversity Metadatabase	

Cytophagia
Bacteria described in 2006